João Luis Vitti, usually known as João Vitti (Piracicaba, São Paulo, October 30, 1967), is a Brazilian theatre and telenovela actor.

In 1992, as Vitti was studying theatre at Unicamp - São Paulo, he entered the casting of Rede Globo.
Vitti achieved national sensation through his participation in the soap opera Despedida de Solteiro, played the role of "Xampu".

He has won the Best Actor award in the 3º FESTE (Festival Salesiano de Teatro Educativo) in São Paulo, for his role in Pássaro da Manhã 1994, a play written by Miguel M. Abrahão.

Personal life
Vitti began dating fellow actress Valéria Alencar in 1994. They were married in 1996 and have two sons, the actors Rafael Vitti and Francisco Vitti. Vitti is a convert to Nichiren Buddhism.

Select filmography

References

External links

Living people
1967 births
People from Piracicaba
Brazilian male stage actors
Brazilian male telenovela actors
Brazilian Buddhists
Nichiren Buddhists
Converts to Buddhism